The Chinese Ambassador to Uzbekistan is the official representative of the People's Republic of China to the Republic of Uzbekistan.

List of representatives

References 

Uzbekistan
China